The Carnegie Hall Concert is a live solo piano double-CD album by the American pianist Keith Jarrett recorded in concert on September 26, 2005, at the Isaac Stern Auditorium of Carnegie Hall, New York City (USA) and released on a double-CD by ECM Records in 2006.

Reception 
The Allmusic review by Thom Jurek awarded the album 4 stars stating, "This is a Jarrett solo set for the ages; it showcases, since his full return in 1997 (sic), his renewed and restless commitment to the music and to himself as an artist."

Applause 
The Carnegie Hall Concert contains applause, audience noise and Jarrett's interactions with fans totalling approximately 20 minutes of extra-musical time between tracks.

"As on many of Jarrett's live discs, producer Manfred Eicher allows the audience's long and thunderous period of applause to overwhelm the end of many tracks" says reviewer Will Layman at Popmatters and "folks tend to be divided about whether this is indulgence (Jarrett's, the arrogant artist) or psychology (Eicher's manipulation -- you are there) or simply padding out the CD's length."

Reviewer John Kelman at All About Jazz notes that "Curious, however, is the applause between tracks—in some cases nearly three minutes long, adding up to nearly nineteen minutes in total. Exciting as it may have been to be there, the lengthy audience noise does nothing but defeat the recorded program's continuity."

Thomas Conrad at JazzTimes has his word stating that "This is a valuable addition to a distinguished body of recorded work. One complaint: With its five encores, the second CD contains more than 17 minutes of applause and 59 minutes of music. This ratio will test the patience of even the most worshipful Jarrett fans in search of a vicarious solo concert experience."

Track listing 
All compositions by Keith Jarrett except as indicated.
Disc one
 "Part I" - 9:56  
 "Part II" - 3:32  
 "Part III" - 4:44  
 "Part IV" - 5:19  
 "Part V" - 9:54 

Disc two
 "Part VI" - 6:50  
 "Part VII" - 8:35  
 "Part VIII" - 5:19  
 "Part IX" - 8:25  
 "Part X" - 9:46
 Encore: "The Good America" - 6:47  
 Encore: "Paint My Heart Red" - 8:30  
 Encore: "My Song" - 8:04  
 Encore: "True Blues" - 7:00  
 Encore: "Time on My Hands" (Adamson, Gordon, Youmans) - 7:30

Total effective playing time: 1:30:02 (the album contains 20:21 applause approximately)

Personnel 
 Keith Jarrett – piano

Production
 Keith Jarrett – recording producer
 Manfred Eicher - executive producer
 Martin Pearson - engineer (recording)
 Sascha Kleis - design
 Richard Termine - photography (concert)

References 

ECM Records albums
Keith Jarrett live albums
2006 live albums
Albums produced by Manfred Eicher
Albums recorded at Carnegie Hall
Instrumental albums
Solo piano jazz albums